Bell Jar can mean:
 bell jar, a piece of glassware used mainly for scientific purposes
 The Bell Jar, a literary work by Sylvia Plath.
 The Bell Jar (film): a 1979 film adaptation of that novel.